Sir Philip Alan Reid,  (born January 18, 1947) has been Chairman of the Duchy of Lancaster since January 2018 and was Keeper of the Privy Purse, Treasurer to the Queen and Receiver General to the Duchy of Lancaster in the Royal Household of the Sovereign of the United Kingdom from 2002 until 2017.

Reid was formerly a senior partner with Big Four accountancy firm KPMG.

As Keeper of the Privy Purse, Reid was responsible for the expenditure of public funds voted by the Parliament to the Sovereign, usually called the Sovereign Grant. As Treasurer to the Queen, he was also responsible for the Sovereign's private finances. The Sovereign also holds the title of Duke of Lancaster (regardless of gender), which brings with it responsibility for the Duchy of Lancaster estates.
He retired from the Royal Household in December 2017.

Reid was appointed a Knight Commander of the Royal Victorian Order (KCVO) in 2007 and elevated to a Knight Grand Cross of the same Order (GCVO) in the 2012 Diamond Jubilee Honours. The knighthood is in the personal bestowal of the Queen and only she may choose to honour an individual with it accordingly.

References

Knights Grand Cross of the Royal Victorian Order
Living people
British accountants
Place of birth missing (living people)
Members of the British Royal Household
1947 births